Four special elections to the National Assembly of the Philippines were done on September 1, 1936. These were to fill up vacancies from four seats.

Electoral system 
The seats in the National Assembly were elected from single member districts, under the first-past-the-post voting system.

The following seats were up for election:

 Abra's at-large district
 Ilocos Norte's 2nd district
 Leyte's 4th district
 Samar's 2nd district

Special elections

Abra 
The seat from Abra was vacated when incumbent Quintín Paredes was appointed Resident Commissioner to the United States, the Commonwealth of the Philippines's delegate in the United States Congress.

Ilocos Norte–2nd 
The seat from Ilocos Norte's 2nd district was vacated when assemblyman-elect Julio Nalundasan was shot at his home in Batac just right after the 1935 legislative election. Nalundasan was murdered on September 20, 1935 while he was brushing his teeth. Ferdinand Marcos, the future president and son of Nalundasan's opponent Mariano, among others, was convicted of murder, but that was reversed on appeal years later.

Leyte–4th 
The seat from Leyte's 4th district was vacated when incumbent Francisco Enage was appointed to be a member of the technical staff in the Malacañang Palace.

Samar–2nd 
The seat from Samar's 2nd district was vacated when incumbent Serafin Marabut was appointed to be undersecretary of finance and director of the Budget Office (now the Secretary of Budget and Management).

See also 

 1940 Philippine National Assembly special elections

References

External links 

 Proclamation No. 70, s. 1936

1936 elections in the Philippines
Special elections to the Congress of the Philippines
Elections in Leyte (province)
Politics of Abra (province)
Politics of Ilocos Norte
Politics of Samar (province)